"Pepys' Diary" is a comic song written and performed by Benny Hill.  Written to spoof a then-current TV series about the diarist Samuel Pepys starring Peter Sallis, it was one of Hill's favourites amongst his compositions.  Hill performed it on his show The Benny Hill Show in 1958, 1971 and 1989

The song has a suitably restoration-style arrangement with harpsichord and woodwind. It begins with the verse:

"A shy young maid has took a room down at the village inn
Her bedside light is oh-so-bright and the curtains oh-so-thin
She enters the room at nine o'clock, at half-past nine she sleeps
Lord Clarendon walks quickly on, but naughty Samuel peeps"

Hill then goes on to recount various innuendo-laden adventures of Samuel Pepys, insisting "Yes, we know it's right / It's in black and white / And it's all written down in his diary.""

The song appeared as the B-side of Hill's top-12 hit "Gather in the Mushrooms".

References
Lewisohn, Mark : Funny Peculiar - The True Story of Benny Hill, Pan 2003, 

Comedy songs
British songs
Benny Hill songs
1961 songs
Song recordings produced by Tony Hatch
Songs about writers
Songs about television
Cultural depictions of writers
Cultural depictions of British men